The Bang Pakong is a river in east Thailand. The river originates at the confluence of the Phra Prong River and the Hanuman River near  Kabin Buri, Prachinburi Province. It empties after 231 kilometres into the Gulf of Thailand at the northeastern tip of the Bay of Bangkok. The river powers a power station near its mouth, near Highway 7.

To protect the Irrawaddy dolphins, fishermen on the Bang Pakong River have been persuaded by authorities to stop shrimping and 30 to 40 fishing boats have been modified so they can offer dolphin sightseeing tours.

Dvaravati settlements include Muang Phra Rot, Dong Si Maha Phot, Dong Lakhon, and Ban Khu Muang. Dvaravati coins have been found at U-Tapao.

Toponymy
Its name "Bang Pakong"  is believed to be distorted from the word "Bang Mangkong" (บางมังกง), refers to "place of Mangkong", for "Mangong" is Thai word meaning long whiskers catfish (Mystus gulio), a species of brackish water catfish that used to be found in this river.

This name has been mentioned in Sunthorn Phu's poem Nirat Mueang  Klaeng (นิราศเมืองแกลง, "journey to Klaeng") since early Rattanakosin period.

Anyway, it is also proposed that the name may have a Khmer origin as a mixture of "Bang" in Thai, meaning "estuary community", and the word "Bongkong" (បង្កង) in Khmer meaning "prawn". Overall, it means "the river full of prawn".

Moreover, this river is known locally in Chachoengsao Province as Jolo River (แม่น้ำโจ้โล้, pinyin: zuǒ lú hé), from the Teochew name for the barramundi (Lates calcarifer) because of the abundance of this species of fish. Famous temples along the river include Wat Pak Nam Jolo and Wat Sothonwararam with Wat Saman Rattanaram.

Tributaries
Nakhon Nayok River

References

Rivers of Thailand
Bay of Bangkok